Thomas's shrew tenrec (Microgale thomasi) is a species of mammal in the family Tenrecidae. It is endemic to Madagascar. Its natural habitat is subtropical or tropical moist lowland forests.

References

Afrosoricida
Mammals of Madagascar
Mammals described in 1896
Taxonomy articles created by Polbot